Melvin Kamatoy Vargas Jr. (born June 11, 1981), also known as Boylet, is a Filipino politician and incumbent Vice Governor of Cagayan. He is the son of former Cagayan Governor Melvin Vargas Sr. and grandson of former Representative Florencio Vargas. In the 2016 election he won the position as Vice Governor of Cagayan opposing Mila Catabay-Lauigan, incumbent Board Member of Cagayan's 3rd District and Ignacio Taruc. From 2007 to 2016, he served as board member of Cagayan from the 2nd District. In 2018, he reacted to incumbent Cagayan Governor Manuel Mamba to run for Vice Governor because Mamba said that for his second term he would run for Vice Governor. Although Vargas said that it was an honor to face Gov. Mamba for the Vice Gubernatorial race since he is known as a veteran in politics. When the Cagayan provincial budget was delayed, Gov. Mamba filed an administrative complaint against the provincial board for delaying the passage of the province's budget in 2017, as bickering among officials dragged on for the second straight year.

References 

Politicians from Cagayan
Living people
1981 births